Seydun District is a district (bakhsh) in Bagh-e Malek County, Khuzestan Province, Iran. At the 2006 census, its population was 22,412, in 4,012 families.  The District has one city: Seydun. The District has two rural districts (dehestan): Seydun-e Jonubi Rural District and Seydun-e Shomali Rural District.

References 

Bagh-e Malek County
Districts of Khuzestan Province